Angus McLeod may refer to:

 Angus McLeod (politician) (1857–1902), farmer, lumber merchant and political figure in Ontario, Canada
 Angus McLeod (sport shooter) (born 1964), British sport shooter
 Angus McLeod (footballer) (1890–1917), Scottish football forward

See also
 Angus MacLeod (disambiguation)